The Croatia women's national water polo team represents Croatia in international women's water polo competitions and friendly matches. The team is controlled by the Croatian Water Polo Federation.

Results

European Championship

Record against other teams at the European Championships

Europa Cup 
2018 – 10th place

Current squad
Roster for the 2022 Women's European Water Polo Championship.

Head coach: Marijo Ćaleta

References

External links

Women's national water polo teams